Hasan Kamil Sporel (1894 – 27 April 1969) was a Turkish footballer. He played as a defender for Fenerbahçe and the Turkey national football team.

Starting in 1911, Hasan Kamil played his entire career for Fenerbahçe. He was the first player to score in a derby against Galatasaray and was the first captain of the national team in a game against Romania.

He moved to the United States to pursue graduate studies. He is the older brother of Zeki Rıza Sporel, a player and president of Fenerbahçe S.K.

References

1894 births
1969 deaths
Turkish footballers
Turkey international footballers
Fenerbahçe S.K. footballers
Fenerbahçe S.K. presidents
Galatasaray S.K. footballers
Galatasaray High School alumni

Association football defenders